Ylipulli is a surname. Notable people with the surname include:

Jukka Ylipulli (born 1963), Finnish Nordic combined skier
Raimo Ylipulli (born 1970), Finnish ski jumper, brother of Jukka and Tuomo
Tuomo Ylipulli (1965–2021), Finnish ski jumper

Finnish-language surnames